Video Graphics Array is a graphics standard for personal computers and associated connectors.

VGA may also refer to:

Computers
 VGA (resolution), 640×480 graphics display resolution
 VGA connector

Technology
 Spike Video Game Awards, a now discontinued awards show much like MTV Video Music Awards focused on video games
 The Game Awards, a video game awards show.
 Variable-gain amplifier, a type of amplifier that varies gain based on some control voltage
 Variable gauge axle, a multiple gauge solution used between incompatible railways

Other
 Virginia General Assembly
 Vijayawada Airport